The tallest building by height in the U.S. city of Columbus, Ohio, is the 41-story Rhodes State Office Tower, which rises  and was completed in 1973. The structure is the fifth-tallest completed building in the state, and is also Ohio's tallest building that rises in the center of a city block. The city's second-tallest structure is the LeVeque Tower; this 1927 Art Deco skyscraper was the first building in the state to be built on caisson foundations. Of the 20 tallest buildings in Ohio, nine are located in Columbus.

The history of skyscrapers in Columbus began with the completion in 1901 of 16 East Broad Street, which is regarded as the first high-rise in the city. Columbus went through an early high-rise construction boom in the 1920s, during which time the city saw the completion of the  LeVeque Tower, which stood as the tallest structure in Columbus for 46 years. However, the pace of new high-rise construction then remained slow until 1960; starting in that year, Columbus entered into a large building boom that lasted until 1991. During that time, most of the city's tallest skyscrapers were built, including the Rhodes State Office Tower and the William Green Building. As of September 2020, there are 96 completed high-rises in the city. Columbus ranks third in the state in high-rise count after Cleveland and Cincinnati, which have 163 and 169 completed high-rises respectively.

Columbus saw very little high-rise construction between 1991 and 2010, with the completion of Fifth Third Center in 1998 and only four other skyscrapers ranking in city's 20 tallest buildings being constructed, the tallest of which is the  Miranova Condominiums (2002), and the 20-story The Condominiums at North Bank Park in 2007.

2011 onward has seen significant high rise development in the downtown and close-in neighborhoods, including the 250 High building, the Hilton Downtown Columbus/Convention Center, the new Columbia Gas Building in the Arena District, and the Le Meridian Hotel at the Joseph in The Short North. As of 2017, there are numerous new high-rise buildings planned and under construction in the downtown area.



Tallest buildings

This includes spires and architectural details but does not include antenna masts. An equal sign (=) following a rank indicates the same height between two or more buildings.

Timeline of tallest buildings

This lists buildings that once held the title of tallest building in Columbus.

Buildings proposed, under construction, or envisioned

Under construction

Announced, approved and current proposals

Past proposals

See also
 Architecture of Columbus, Ohio
 List of tallest buildings in Ohio

Notes
A.  New York has 282 completed buildings at least , Chicago has 126, Miami has 53, Houston has 39, Los Angeles has 26, San Francisco has 25, Seattle has 21, Dallas has 20, Boston has 20, Atlanta has 17, Las Vegas has 14, Philadelphia has 13, Minneapolis has 12, Jersey City has 11, Austin has 10, Pittsburgh has 10, Detroit has 8, Denver has 8, Charlotte has 7, and Columbus has 5.

References
General

Specific

External links
Diagram of Columbus skyscrapers on SkyscraperPage

Columbus, Ohio
Tallest in Columbus
Tallest buildings